Heini Vaikmaa (born 5 July 1958) is an Estonian musician and composer.

He was the founder of the band Mahavok. With Mahavok he participated in Eesti Laul 2010.

Works
 rock opera "Hing ja iha"
 rock opera "Võti paradiisi"

References

Living people
1958 births
Estonian composers